The 1967 Singapore Open, also known as the 1967 Singapore Open Badminton Championships, took place from 6 to 8 October 1967 at the Singapore Badminton Hall in Singapore.

Venue
Singapore Badminton Hall

Final results

References 

Singapore Open (badminton)
1967 in badminton